Mathematics during the Golden Age of Islam, especially during the 9th and 10th centuries, was built on Greek mathematics (Euclid, Archimedes, Apollonius) and Indian mathematics (Aryabhata, Brahmagupta). Important progress was made, such as full development of the decimal place-value system to include decimal fractions, the first systematised study of algebra, and advances in geometry and trigonometry.

Arabic works played an important role in the transmission of mathematics to Europe during the 10th—12th centuries.

Concepts

Algebra 

The study of algebra, the name of which is derived from the Arabic word meaning completion or "reunion of broken parts", flourished during the Islamic golden age. Muhammad ibn Musa al-Khwarizmi, a Persian scholar in the House of Wisdom in Baghdad was the founder of algebra, is along with the Greek mathematician Diophantus, known as the father of algebra. In his book The Compendious Book on Calculation by Completion and Balancing, Al-Khwarizmi deals with ways to solve for the positive roots of first and second degree (linear and quadratic) polynomial equations. He introduces the method of reduction, and unlike Diophantus, also gives general solutions for the equations he deals with.

Al-Khwarizmi's algebra was rhetorical, which means that the equations were written out in full sentences. This was unlike the algebraic work of Diophantus, which was syncopated, meaning that some symbolism is used. The transition to symbolic algebra, where only symbols are used, can be seen in the work of Ibn al-Banna' al-Marrakushi and Abū al-Ḥasan ibn ʿAlī al-Qalaṣādī.

On the work done by Al-Khwarizmi, J. J. O'Connor and Edmund F. Robertson said:

Several other mathematicians during this time period expanded on the algebra of Al-Khwarizmi. Abu Kamil Shuja' wrote a book of algebra accompanied with geometrical illustrations and proofs. He also enumerated all the possible solutions to some of his problems. Abu al-Jud, Omar Khayyam, along with Sharaf al-Dīn al-Tūsī, found several solutions of the cubic equation. Omar Khayyam found the general geometric solution of a cubic equation.

Cubic equations 

Omar Khayyam (c. 1038/48 in Iran – 1123/24) wrote the Treatise on Demonstration of Problems of Algebra containing the systematic solution of cubic or third-order equations, going beyond the Algebra of al-Khwārizmī. Khayyám obtained the solutions of these equations by finding the intersection points of two conic sections. This method had been used by the Greeks, but they did not generalize the method to cover all equations with positive roots.

Sharaf al-Dīn al-Ṭūsī (? in Tus, Iran – 1213/4) developed a novel approach to the investigation of cubic equations—an approach which entailed finding the point at which a cubic polynomial obtains its maximum value. His surviving works give no indication of how he discovered his formulae for the maxima of these curves. Various conjectures have been proposed to account for his discovery of them.<ref>{{cite journal |last1=Berggren |first1=J. Lennart |title=Innovation and Tradition in Sharaf al-Dīn al-Ṭūsī's al-Muʿādalāt |jstor=604533 |journal=Journal of the American Oriental Society |volume=110 |issue=2 |year=1990 |pages=304–309 |doi=10.2307/604533 |last2=Al-Tūsī |first2=Sharaf Al-Dīn |last3=Rashed |first3=Roshdi}}</ref>

 Induction 

The earliest implicit traces of mathematical induction can be found in Euclid's proof that the number of primes is infinite (c. 300 BCE). The first explicit formulation of the principle of induction was given by Pascal in his Traité du triangle arithmétique (1665).

In between, implicit proof by induction for arithmetic sequences was introduced by al-Karaji (c. 1000) and continued by al-Samaw'al, who used it for special cases of the binomial theorem and properties of Pascal's triangle.

 Irrational numbers 
The Greeks had discovered irrational numbers, but were not happy with them and only able to cope by drawing a distinction between magnitude and number. In the Greek view, magnitudes varied continuously and could be used for entities such as line segments, whereas numbers were discrete. Hence, irrationals could only be handled geometrically; and indeed Greek mathematics was mainly geometrical. Islamic mathematicians including Abū Kāmil Shujāʿ ibn Aslam and Ibn Tahir al-Baghdadi slowly removed the distinction between magnitude and number, allowing irrational quantities to appear as coefficients in equations and to be solutions of algebraic equations. They worked freely with irrationals as mathematical objects, but they did not examine closely their nature.
 
In the twelfth century, Latin translations of Al-Khwarizmi's Arithmetic on the Indian numerals introduced the decimal positional number system to the Western world. His Compendious Book on Calculation by Completion and Balancing presented the first systematic solution of linear and quadratic equations. In Renaissance Europe, he was considered the original inventor of algebra, although it is now known that his work is based on older Indian or Greek sources. He revised Ptolemy's Geography and wrote on astronomy and astrology. However, C.A. Nallino suggests that al-Khwarizmi's original work was not based on Ptolemy but on a derivative world map, presumably in Syriac or Arabic.

 Spherical trigonometry 

The spherical law of sines was discovered in the 10th century: it has been attributed variously to Abu-Mahmud Khojandi, Nasir al-Din al-Tusi and Abu Nasr Mansur, with Abu al-Wafa' Buzjani as a contributor. Ibn Muʿādh al-Jayyānī's The book of unknown arcs of a sphere in the 11th century introduced the general law of sines. The plane law of sines was described in the 13th century by Nasīr al-Dīn al-Tūsī. In his On the Sector Figure, he stated the law of sines for plane and spherical triangles and provided proofs for this law.

 Negative numbers 

In the 9th century, Islamic mathematicians were familiar with negative numbers from the works of Indian mathematicians, but the recognition and use of negative numbers during this period remained timid. Al-Khwarizmi did not use negative numbers or negative coefficients. But within fifty years, Abu Kamil illustrated the rules of signs for expanding the multiplication . Al-Karaji wrote in his book al-Fakhrī that "negative quantities must be counted as terms". In the 10th century, Abū al-Wafā' al-Būzjānī considered debts as negative numbers in A Book on What Is Necessary from the Science of Arithmetic for Scribes and Businessmen.

By the 12th century, al-Karaji's successors were to state the general rules of signs and use them to solve polynomial divisions. As al-Samaw'al writes:
the product of a negative number — al-nāqiṣ — by a positive number — al-zāʾid — is negative, and by a negative number is positive. If we subtract a negative number from a higher negative number, the remainder is their negative difference. The difference remains positive if we subtract a negative number from a lower negative number. If we subtract a negative number from a positive number, the remainder is their positive sum. If we subtract a positive number from an empty power (martaba khāliyya), the remainder is the same negative, and if we subtract a negative number from an empty power, the remainder is the same positive number.

 Double false position 

Between the 9th and 10th centuries, the Egyptian mathematician Abu Kamil wrote a now-lost treatise on the use of double false position, known as the Book of the Two Errors (Kitāb al-khaṭāʾayn). The oldest surviving writing on double false position from the Middle East is that of Qusta ibn Luqa (10th century), an Arab mathematician from Baalbek, Lebanon. He justified the technique by a formal, Euclidean-style geometric proof. Within the tradition of Golden Age Muslim mathematics, double false position was known as hisāb al-khaṭāʾayn ("reckoning by two errors"). It was used for centuries to solve practical problems such as commercial and juridical questions (estate partitions according to rules of Quranic inheritance), as well as purely recreational problems. The algorithm was often memorized with the aid of mnemonics, such as a verse attributed to Ibn al-Yasamin and balance-scale diagrams explained by al-Hassar and Ibn al-Banna, who were each mathematicians of Moroccan origin.

 Other major figures 
Sally P. Ragep, a historian of science in Islam, estimated in 2019 that "tens of thousands" of Arabic manuscripts in mathematical sciences and philosophy remain unread, which give studies which "reflect individual biases and a limited focus on a relatively few texts and scholars".

 'Abd al-Hamīd ibn Turk (fl. 830) (quadratics)
 Thabit ibn Qurra (826–901)
 Sind ibn Ali (d. after 864)
 Ismail al-Jazari (1136–1206)
 Abū Sahl al-Qūhī (c. 940–1000) (centers of gravity)
 Abu'l-Hasan al-Uqlidisi (952–953) (arithmetic)
 'Abd al-'Aziz al-Qabisi (d. 967)
 Ibn al-Haytham (c. 965–1040)
 Abū al-Rayḥān al-Bīrūnī (973–1048) (trigonometry)
 Ibn Maḍāʾ (c. 1116–1196)
 Jamshīd al-Kāshī (c. 1380–1429) (decimals and estimation of the circle constant)

 Gallery 

 See also 
 Arabic numerals
 Indian influence on Islamic mathematics in medieval Islam
 History of calculus
 History of geometry
 Science in the medieval Islamic world
 Timeline of science and engineering in the Muslim world

 References 

 Sources 

 
 
 
 
 
 
 

Further reading

Books on Islamic mathematics
 
 Review: 
 Review: 
 
 
 
  Sowjetische Beiträge zur Geschichte der Naturwissenschaft pp. 62–160.
 

 Book chapters on Islamic mathematics
 

 Books on Islamic science
 
 

 Books on the history of mathematics
 
 

Journal articles on Islamic mathematics
 Høyrup, Jens. “The Formation of «Islamic Mathematics»: Sources and Conditions”. Filosofi og Videnskabsteori på Roskilde Universitetscenter. 3. Række: Preprints og Reprints 1987 Nr. 1.

Bibliographies and biographies
 Brockelmann, Carl. Geschichte der Arabischen Litteratur. 1.–2. Band, 1.–3. Supplementband. Berlin: Emil Fischer, 1898, 1902; Leiden: Brill, 1937, 1938, 1942.
 
 
 

 Television documentaries
 Marcus du Sautoy (presenter) (2008). "The Genius of the East". The Story of Maths. BBC.
 Jim Al-Khalili (presenter) (2010). Science and Islam''. BBC.

External links

Richard Covington, Rediscovering Arabic Science, 2007, Saudi Aramco World
List of Inventions and Discoveries in Mathematics During the Islamic Golden Age

 
Islamic Golden Age